The following is a list of attacks on diplomatic buildings (embassies, consulates) anywhere in the world. The list does not include attacks on individuals outside or inside an embassy, such as assassinations of ambassadors, or incidents such as letter bombs to individuals.

List

See also

 List of terrorist incidents
 Terrorist attacks on U.S. diplomatic facilities
 List of attacks against Israeli embassies and diplomats

References

External links
 Infoplease.com
 Pyotr A. Litvishko, "International Law Aspects of the Criminal Proceedings concerning the Attack on the Embassy of the Russian Federation in Kiev", in The Tragedy of Southeastern Ukraine. The White Book of Crimes, ed. by Alexander I. Bastrykin (Moscow: The RF Investigative Committee, 2015), 2nd ed., pp. 329–39.. URL:http://www.mid.ru/documents/10180/2141156/BELAYa_KNIGA_eng.pdf/c6c2bfb2-8d15-4419-bcef-6e6aab0effb5

List
Attacks
Diplomatic missions